Johannes Marten den Uijl, better known as Joop den Uyl (9 August 1919 – 24 December 1987) was a Dutch politician and economist who served as Prime Minister of the Netherlands from 1973 to 1977. He was a member of the Labour Party (PvdA).

Den Uyl studied Economics at the University of Amsterdam obtaining a Master of Economics degree and worked as a civil servant at the Ministry of Economic Affairs from February 1942 until May 1945 and as a journalist and editor for Het Parool and Vrij Nederland from May 1945 until January 1949. Den Uyl served as director of the Wiardi Beckman Foundation from January 1949 until June 1963. Den Uyl became a Member of the House of Representatives shortly after the number of seats was raised from 100 to 150 seats following the election of 1956 serving from 6 November 1956 until 5 June 1963 as a frontbencher and spokesperson for Economics. Den Uyl was appointed as Minister of Economic Affairs in the Cals Cabinet, taking office on 14 April 1965. After Labour Leader Anne Vondeling unexpectedly announced he was stepping down, Den Uyl announced his candidacy and was selected as his successor as Leader on 13 September 1966. In the election of 1967 Den Uyl served as Lijsttrekker (top candidate) and became Parliamentary leader, taking office on 23 February 1967. In the election of 1972 Den Uyl again served as Lijsttrekker and after a long cabinet formation formed the Den Uyl Cabinet and became Prime Minister of the Netherlands, taking office on 11 May 1973.

The Cabinet collapsed on 22 March 1977 following years of tensions in the ruling coalition. During the election of 1977 Den Uyl served as Lijsttrekker but following a difficult cabinet formation failed to create a new coalition. Den Uyl left office following the installation of the First Van Agt Cabinet on 19 December 1977 but continued to serve in the House of Representatives as Parliamentary leader. For the election of 1981 Den Uyl again served as Lijsttrekker and following a cabinet formation with his successor- the leader of the Christian Democratic Appeal, Dries van Agt- formed the Second Van Agt Cabinet with Den Uyl appointed as Deputy Prime Minister and Minister of Social Affairs and Employment, taking office on 11 September 1981. The cabinet fell just seven months into its term and was replaced with the caretaker Third Van Agt Cabinet, with Den Uyl resigning on 29 May 1982. For the election of 1982 Den Uyl again served as Lijsttrekker and returned to the House of Representatives as Parliamentary leader, taking office on 16 September 1982. For the election of 1986 Den Uyl once again served as Lijsttrekker but shortly thereafter announced he was stepping down as Leader on 21 July 1986 and endorsed former trade union leader Wim Kok as his successor though continued to serve in the House of Representatives as a backbencher. In October 1987 Den Uyl was diagnosed with a terminal brain tumor and died just three months later at the age of 68.

Den Uyl was known for his abilities as a skillful debater and as an idealistic and determined leader. During his premiership, his cabinet were responsible for major social reforms and dealing with several major crises such as the 1973 oil crisis, the Lockheed scandal, Moluccans incidents and the fallout of the Yom Kippur War. He holds the distinction as leading the most left-wing Dutch cabinet, and his premiership is seen as divisive with both scholars and the public, from considering him to have been average to him having been one of the best Prime Ministers since World War II.

Early life

Johannes Marten den Uijl was born on 9 August 1919 in the town of Hilversum. He was born in a Calvinist Reformed family. His father, Johannes den Uyl, was a shopkeeper and a basket weaver who died when Den Uyl was 10. Den Uyl attended the Christian Lyceum, the modern-day Comenius College, in Hilversum from 1931 to 1936. Following this he studied Economics at the University of Amsterdam. During this period in his life he left the church. In 1942 he attained the doctorandus degree. Until 1945 he was a civil servant at the National Bureau for Prices of Chemical Products, part of the Ministry of Economic Affairs. During that period he was part of the underground newspaper group that published the clandestine Het Parool. After World War II, Den Uyl worked for Het Parool, Vrij Nederland and other former resistance papers. From January 1949 to 1963 he was the head of the Wiardi Beckman Stichting, the think tank of the social democratic Labour Party. In 1953, at the invitation of the American government, Den Uyl stayed in the United States for a few months, gaining an appreciation of the American experience.

Political career
In 1953 Den Uyl was elected to the municipal council of Amsterdam and in 1956 he was elected to the House of Representatives. In 1963 he became municipal administrator for economic affairs in Amsterdam, resigning his parliamentary seat. He resigned that post in 1965 to become Minister of Economic Affairs in the Cals cabinet. As the responsible minister, he decided to close the uneconomic coal mines in Limburg, causing high local unemployment. Following the parliamentary elections of 1967, he became leader of the Labour Party in parliament.

Den Uyl's Labour Party won the 1972 election in alliance with the progressive liberal Democrats 66 and radical Christian Political Party of Radicals, but failed to achieve a majority in parliament. After lengthy negotiations, he formed Den Uyl cabinet with the Christian democratic Catholic People's Party and Anti-Revolutionary Party. This cabinet faced many problems. An early problem was the 1973 oil boycott following the Dutch support of Israel in the Yom Kippur war. Den Uyl said in a speech on national television that "things would never return to the way they were" and implemented fuel rationing and a ban on Sunday driving.

Between 1973 and 1977, the country's economic situation turned ugly. The government's budget deficit increased tenfold, inflation approached 10 percent, the unemployment rate doubled, and the current account went from positive to negative – the latter a critical problem in a country that rises or falls on foreign trade. Despite economic difficulties, however, the government was able to enact a wide range of progressive social reforms, such as significant increases in welfare payments, the indexation of benefits and the minimum wage to contractual private sector wage developments, a system of rent rebates (1975), and a universal work incapacity insurance scheme (1976). The Primary Education Act of October 1974 gave more freedom to school heads regarding the programming of the curriculum, and an Act of June 1974 made supplementary benefits available to unemployed persons who accepted lower paid- work. In addition, a law of June 1976 enabled employees aged sixty, two years after the first date of receipt of benefits (WWV scheme), to continue receiving them until the age of sixty-five. The purpose of this legislation was to improve the financial circumstances of older employees who are unemployed for a long time. In August 1976, job protection was introduced during pregnancy and for 12 weeks following childbirth. The number of years of full compulsory education were increased, and an Act on equal pay in the private sector was introduced. In addition, investments were carried out in social services, such as home care services for families.

A regulation was introduced in September 1973 providing for the employment of persons "for whom it is difficult to find employment and who have been in prolonged unemployment." In January 1974, a statutory minimum wage for young people between the ages of 15 and 22 was introduced, and in March 1974 the insurance scheme for wage and salary earners was extended to cover the costs of physiotherapy treatment "where this has been prescribed by a doctor." In September 1975, a regulation on the promotion of vocational training for young people was introduced, aimed at "a great number of young people who, as a result of the present educational system, depend on on-the-job training within the framework of the Apprenticeship Law." The chances of obtaining an individual rent subsidy were also significantly increased, while an Act of June 1975 amended a number of existing Acts "with a view to introducing changes regarding the organisation and the districts of factory inspection and the inspection of ports and dangerous machinery,” and also conferred legislative powers on the Minister of Social Affairs under the Act "concerning the loading and unloading of ocean-going vessels and extended the scope of the Silicosis Act."

The Collective Redundancy (Notification) Act of 1976 imposed an obligation on employers (who intend to collectively dismiss employees) "to give written notice of this intention to the relevant trade unions for consultation," while that same year consultative works councils were replaced by powerful ones modelled after the German works councils. Also in 1976, a law was passed forbidding dismissal upon pregnancy or marriage for all women.

A February 1976 regulation on accidents in nuclear installations provided for interministerial coordination on measures to be taken "in the event of accidents and for the preparation of an emergency plan," while a law of June 1976 provided for special measures for unemployed persons who reached the age of 60 and who had used up their rights to unemployment benefit. A law of December 1976 relaxed the conditions for exemption from national insurance contributions or entitlement to ·pay reduced contributions, and  also extended entitlement to orphans' pensions "to illegitimate children whose mothers are dead and who have not been recognised by their fathers." The Asbestos Decree of April 1977 prohibited the storage and use of crocidolite (blue asbestos) and materials or products containing crocidolite and also prohibited "the spraying of asbestos or materials or products containing asbestos and their use for thermal insulation or for acoustic, preservative or decorative purposes." In September 1977, regulations were issued "regarding the conditions under which young persons of 16 and over may exceptionally drive agricultural tractors." In May 1977, a subsidy scheme for the placing of handicapped persons was introduced.

In 1977, the Den Uyl cabinet fell due to a conflict between Den Uyl and the Catholic People's Party Minister of Justice Dries van Agt. The Labour Party entered the subsequent election under the banner "Vote for the Prime Minister". The Labour Party won by a landslide, receiving over 33% percent of the votes, a relatively large share in the divided politics of the Netherlands at that time, and 53 seats. Labour's coalition partner Democrats 66 also made gains, from 6 to 8 seats. However, its other coalition partner, the Political Party of Radicals, lost nearly all its seats, making it impossible for Den Uyl to form a new government that he could count on to support him in parliament. More than 200 days after the election, the Christian Democratic Appeal (a new party that was formed by Den Uyl's former coalition partners, the Catholic People's Party and the Anti-Revolutionary Party, joined by the smaller Christian Historical Union) formed a cabinet with the liberal People's Party for Freedom and Democracy, supported by a small majority of 77 seats (out of a total of 150).

After being opposition leader from 1977 to 1981, Den Uyl returned to government in 1981. The Labour Party formed a coalition with the Christian Democratic Appeal and the Democrats 66. Den Uyl became Deputy Prime Minister and Minister for Social Affairs and Employment. Van Agt, by now Den Uyl's nemesis, led this cabinet. The cabinet was in constant internal conflict and fell after eight months. The Labour Party won the snap election of 1982, but could not agree on a new coalition with the Christian Democratic Appeal. As a result, Den Uyl returned to parliament and led the Labour Party in opposition until 1986. As leader of the main opposition party, Den Uyl, always a soft-spoken Atlanticist, provided cover for the government's controversial decision to place NATO cruise missiles on Dutch soil. In turn, this decision, and a similar one by the Belgian government, satisfied one of the West German conditions for the placement of cruise missiles and Pershing II missiles in West Germany.

Family and later life
On 30 August 1944, Den Uyl married Liesbeth den Uyl, née Van Vessem (18 June 1924 – 30 September 1990). They had three sons and four daughters. Of those the eldest Saskia Noorman-den Uyl became a member of parliament for the Labour Party herself serving until 1994 until 2006. Xander den Uyl became a leading figure in ABVAKABO, one of the Dutch labour unions and serves as Member of the Provincial-Council of North Holland for the Labour Party since 2011.

After the elections of 1986, in which the Labour Party won 5 seats but failed to retain its position as largest party, Den Uyl was succeeded as leader of the Labour Party by Wim Kok.

Death
On 24 October 1987, the VU University Medical Center announced that Den Uyl had become terminally ill. He died exactly two months later, on Christmas Eve 1987, aged 68, of a brain tumor.

Decorations

Honorary degrees

Further reading
 Wilsford, David, ed. Political leaders of contemporary Western Europe: a biographical dictionary (Greenwood, 1995) pp 97–111.

Quotes
"Twee dingen:..." ("Two things:..."  In interviews, many of Den Uyl's answers started with these two words, sending a signal to the listener to drop any expectation of a simple yes or no.)

References

External links

Official
  Dr. J.M. (Joop) den Uyl Parlement & Politiek

 

 

1919 births
1987 deaths
Aldermen of Amsterdam
Deaths from brain cancer in the Netherlands
Deputy Prime Ministers of the Netherlands
Dutch agnostics
Dutch anti-war activists
Dutch former Christians
Dutch magazine editors
Dutch newspaper editors
Dutch people of World War II
Dutch political writers
Resistance members from Amsterdam
Dutch social justice activists
Former Calvinist and Reformed Christians
Grand Officers of the Order of Orange-Nassau
Housing reformers
Knights of the Order of the Netherlands Lion
Labour Party (Netherlands) politicians
Leaders of the Labour Party (Netherlands)
Members of the House of Representatives (Netherlands)
Ministers of Economic Affairs of the Netherlands
Ministers of General Affairs of the Netherlands
Ministers of Kingdom Relations of the Netherlands
Ministers of Social Affairs of the Netherlands
Municipal councillors of Amsterdam
People from Hilversum
Presidents of the European Council
Presidents of the Party of European Socialists
Prime Ministers of the Netherlands
Recipients of the Order of the House of Orange
University of Amsterdam alumni
20th-century Dutch economists
20th-century Dutch journalists
20th-century Dutch male writers
20th-century Dutch politicians